Javier Etcheberry Celhay (born 14 March 1947) is a Chilean politician who served as minister.

References

1947 births

Living people
21st-century Chilean politicians
University of Chile alumni
University of Michigan alumni
Party for Democracy (Chile) politicians
Politicians from Santiago